Dasik (lit. "tea food") is a bite-size hangwa that is normally accompanied by tea. It can be made by kneading grain or other edible seed flour or pollen with honey, then pressing them into a decorative mould called dasikpan. A dasik plate usually consists of an assortment of dasik of different colours, including green, yellow, pink, black, and white. Typical ingredients include: rice flour, pine pollen, black sesame, chestnut, and soybean.

Varieties
bam dasik – made of steamed and mashed chestnut, or chestnut powder from finely sliced and sun-dried chestnuts
geomeunkkae dasik – made of toasted black sesame seed powder
kkae dasik – made of toasted sesame seed powder
kong dasik – made of steamed and pounded yellow soybean
pureunkong dasik – made of steamed and pounded green soybean
songhwa dasik – made of pine pollen
ssal dasik – made of steamed, dried, toasted, and then pounded glutinous rice flour

Origin

Dasik is a food that was introduced to Korea from China during the Song Dynasty in China. Dasik became a ceremonial food for weddings during the Joseon Dynasty.

Dasikpan
Dasik is shaped with a wooden or porcelain press that forms a patterned confectionery. The press is engraved with a design that forms an embossed pattern on the dasik piece. The design would symbolize the family's name in order to wish for a long life or for a special event, like hwangap or 60th birthday or weddings.
Press the dough into a Dasikpan that has letters, flowers or a geometric pattern is embossed. The surface of dasik has letters, flower patterns, or Chinese letters 壽·福·康·寧 representing long life, luck, health and peacefulness.  
Two dasikpan forms one set. Its length is 30–60cm, width is 5–6cm, and thickness is 2–3cm.

See also 
 Bánh đậu xanh

References

External links
Dasik: Unique Delicacy to Accompany Tea
Sweet treats for teatime snacks article at JoongAng Ilbo

Hangwa